Rahmanabad-e Zagheh-ye Lalvand (also Romanized as Raḩmānābād-e Zāgheh-ye Lālvand; also known as Raḩmān-e Barkhvordārī and Raḩmān) is a village in Rumeshkhan Rural District, Central District, Rumeshkhan County, Lorestan Province, Iran. At the 2006 census, its population was 673, in 138 families.

References 

Populated places in Rumeshkhan County